Torrente 3: el protector is a 2005 Spanish black comedy film directed, written, produced and starring Santiago Segura as the lead character, Spanish cop José Luis Torrente. The film was the third in the popular Torrente series (following Torrente 2: misión en Marbella) and was successful at the box office. Santiago Segura decided to make a parody of the American film The Bodyguard, which was directed by Mick Jackson and starred Kevin Costner and Whitney Houston.

Cast 
 Santiago Segura as Torrente; the actor had to gain 20 kilos in weight in order to portray his character again.
 José Mota as Josito
 Carlos Latre as Pepito Torrente, Torrente's son
 Javier Gutiérrez as Juan Francisco Solís
 Yvonne Sciò as Giannina Ricci
 Enrique Villén as Salas
 Luis Larrodera as Menéndez
 Silvia Gambino as Vanessa
 Tony Leblanc as Mauricio Torrente
 Ruth Zanón as Fiorella
 Xavier Deltell as Linares
 Jimmy Barnatán as José María
 Fabio Testi as Montellini Roures
 Beatriz Castillo as Boor stewardess
 Lucía Lapiedra as Dancer at brothel
 Edda Díaz as Plane passenger next to Torrente

Cameos 
 Film directors: Oliver Stone, Chris Columbus, John Landis and Guillermo del Toro.
 Humorists: Andreu Buenafuente, Florentino Fernández, Marcos Mundstock, Santiago Urrialde, Fofito and Señor Barragán.
 Athletes: Fernando Torres, Iker Casillas, Iván Helguera, Guti, Fran Murcia and Luís Figo.
 Actors: Benicio del Toro, Helga Liné, Carlos Iglesias, Carlos Pumares, Miriam Sánchez, Tony Leblanc, Pablo Pinedo, Eduardo Gómez and Eduardo García (young Torrente).
 Singers: Dani Martín and El Fary
 Others: El Risitas and Cañita Brava

Video Game 
On October 5, 2005, a video game adaptation under the same name was released for the PlayStation 2 and Windows. It was developed by Virtual Toys and Published by Virgin Play, being the latter's first self-published title. The game was also released outside Spain as Torrente 3: The Protector with English voice acting.

See also 
 List of Spanish films of 2005

References

External links 
 Official website

2005 films
Films shot in Madrid
Spanish comedy films
2000s Spanish-language films
Madrid in fiction
Films shot in Buenos Aires
Films scored by Roque Baños
Films directed by Santiago Segura
2000s Spanish films